Unwanted, The Unwanted or The Unwanteds may refer to:

 Unwanted (album), a 2022 album by the band Pale Waves
 , 2017 Kosovan film by Edon Rizvanolli
 "Unwanted", a 2002 song by Avril Lavigne on the Let Go album
 , British film by Walter Summers
 , Argentine film by Mario Soffici
 The Unwanted, 2014 American film by Bret Wood
 The Unwanteds, a fantasy book series by Lisa McMann
 The Unwanteds (book), the first book in the above series

See also 
 Wanted (disambiguation)